Dreamer is the sixth studio album by Brazilian acoustic rock cover musician Emmerson Nogueira.

Track listing

References

2008 albums
Emmerson Nogueira albums
Sony Music Brazil albums